The 2021–22 Maltese National Amateur League (referred to, for sponsorship reasons, as the BOV National Amateur League), was the third level league football in Malta. This is the second season since the unification of both the Second and Third Divisions into the three-group Amateur League system. Żurrieq won the title by beating fellow group winners Attard in the championship final. The second-placed promotion play-off saw Marsaskala defeat Għargħur by 2 goals to 1 with Għargħur facing Mtarfa in the promotion play-off final. Mtarfa won all four of their post-league stage games, in the process winning the play-off final against Għargħur to win promotion to the Challenge League.

Teams 
Nineteen teams are competing in the league.  These were split into two groups, one group of ten and another of nine. The top team from each group will be promoted with another team to be promoted emerging from the play-offs, a deciding match with the winner of each group being declared the champion of the league. The clubs placed second in each group shall play a deciding promotion play-off match and the winner shall be promoted to the Challenge League. The losing side will play in the final of the play-offs. The play-offs will start with the fifth placed team from group A playing with fourth placed side from group B and vice versa. The winners from the first round will play the third placed clubs in either group. The second round winners will play each other in the third round with the winners of that contest going on to play the runners-up from the promotion final.

League stage

Group A

Group B

Results

National Amateur League group A results

National Amateur League group B results

Promotion play-offs

Second-place promotion decider

Play-offs

Quarter-finals

Semi-finals

Play-offs final

Promotion final

Championship play-offs

Championship final

References

External links 
 Official website

Malta
1